The Story of Fausta is a 1988 Brazilian drama film directed by Bruno Barreto. The film was selected as the Brazilian entry for the Best Foreign Language Film at the 61st Academy Awards, but was not accepted as a nominee.

Cast
 Betty Faria as Fausta
 Brandão Filho as Zé da Placa
 Expedito Barreira
 Nika Bonfim
 Mário Borges
 Neuza Borges
 Cândido Damm
 Arthur Costa Filho
 Daniel Filho as João
 Stela Freitas as amiga de Fausta
 Cláudia Jimenez

See also
 List of submissions to the 61st Academy Awards for Best Foreign Language Film
 List of Brazilian submissions for the Academy Award for Best Foreign Language Film

References

External links
 

1988 films
1988 drama films
Brazilian drama films
1980s Portuguese-language films
Films directed by Bruno Barreto